= Tarbana =

Town of ancient Caria or Lycia

Tarbana (city-ethnic: Ancient Greek: Ταρβανεῖς, Tarbaneis) was a town of ancient Caria or Lycia. Its name does not appear in ancient authors, but is inferred from epigraphic evidence: the Tarbanians appear in the Athenian tribute lists and paid an annual tribute of 17 drachmae, 1 obol. Thus, Tarbana was a member of the Delian League.

Its site is unlocated. The town was possibly the same as Trybanes (Τρυβανῆς).
