= Trybanes =

Town of ancient Caria

Trybanes (Ancient Greek: Τρυβανῆς) was a town of ancient Caria. The town was possibly the same as Tarbanes (Ταρβανῆς).

Its site is unlocated.
